Emotion is an album by the Congolese singer Papa Wemba, released in 1995. Wemba sang mostly in Lingala.

The album peaked at No. 14 on Billboard'''s World Albums chart. Wemba promoted the album by touring North America.

Production
The album was produced by Stephen Hague. "Fa Fa Fa Fa Fa (Sad Song)", a duet with Juliet Roberts, is a cover of the Otis Redding song; Redding was Wemba's favorite singer. Jean-Philippe Rykiel played keyboards on Emotion.

Critical receptionThe Guardian wrote that "Wemba's singing is high, relaxed and fine as ever, whether he's tackling a synth-backed funky dance piece, or switching to a guitar-backed ballad." Robert Christgau stated: "Piercing and penetrating without a hint of muezzin, he also commands a 'natural,' 'conversational' timbre richer and rangier than that of his more soft-sung Zairean colleagues.

The Toronto Star noted that "soukous purists likely won't have it ... But terrific listening for everyone else." The Calgary Herald determined that "the propulsive, rolling polyrythmic rhythms here owe as much to western pop as to Wemba's Zairean traditions." The Houston Press'' concluded that "Hague insured that Wemba's vocals took center stage on each tune, turning down the driving African percussion just a notch."

AllMusic wrote that "in mixing his unique brand of African soukous with various Western influences, Papa Wemba took a bold step into the international pop market already populated by Senegalese singing sensations Youssou N'Dour and Baaba Maal."

Track listing

References 

1995 albums
albums produced by Stephen Hague
Real World Records albums